Žiželice is a municipality and village in Kolín District in the Central Bohemian Region of the Czech Republic. It has about 1,700 inhabitants. It is located on the Cidlina River.

Administrative parts
Villages of Hradišťko II, Končice, Kundratice, Loukonosy, Pod Vinicí and Zbraň are administrative parts of Žiželice.

References

Villages in Kolín District